Long Hill is a small unincorporated community in the Long Hill Township of Surry County, North Carolina.  The community is centered on the intersection of Longhill Road, Ararat Road and Old U.S. Highway 52.

See also
 Long Hill Township

References

Unincorporated communities in Surry County, North Carolina
Unincorporated communities in North Carolina